Orthophytum falconii is a plant species in the genus Orthophytum. This species is endemic to Brazil.

References

falconii
Flora of Brazil